Calvary Christian School (CCS) is a Christian, Independent Baptist private school located in King, North Carolina that was founded in 1982 by Roger Baker.

History

In 1982, Pastor Roger Baker of Calvary Baptist Church in King, North Carolina had a desire to reach young children to Christ and Calvary Christian School was established. Tom Callahan was the first principal of CCS. Currently Sidney Main is the principal and has been for the past 25+ years. Anthony Keel is currently the longest running teacher at CCS.

On March 12, 2020, CCS was dramatically affected in the COVID-19 pandemic which led to remote learning for the remainder of the school year. However, CCS will begin the 2020–2021 school year with in-class learning while observing social distancing guidelines and masks will be optional.

References

Private high schools in North Carolina